A general election was held in the U.S. state of Wyoming on Tuesday, November 4, 1986. All of the state's executive officers—the Governor, Secretary of State, Auditor, Treasurer, and Superintendent of Public Instruction—were up for election. Democrats performed well in the year's elections; Democratic nominee Mike Sullivan won the gubernatorial election by a decisive margin, Superintendent Lynn Simons won a sizable majority in her bid for a third term, and Kathy Karpan won the open Secretary of State's race. Republicans prevailed in elections for State Auditor and Treasurer.

Governor

Incumbent Democratic Governor Edgar Herschler declined to run for re-election to a fourth term, and attorney Mike Sullivan won the Democratic primary to succeed him. He faced former State Representative Pete Simpson in the general election, whom he defeated by a decisive margin.

Secretary of State
Incumbent Republican Secretary of State Thyra Thomson declined to run for re-election to a seventh term. Her son, K. C. Thomson, a Sheridan banker, ran in the Republican primary to succeed her, as did State Senate President Jerry Geis. The contest between the two was extremely close, with unofficial results showing Thomson with a 61-vote lead over Geis. The recount confirmed Thomson's narrow victory over Geis, and he advanced to the general election, where he faced Kathy Karpan, the former Director of the Wyoming Department of Health and Social Services in Governor Edgar Herschler's cabinet. Karpan ended up narrowly defeating Thomson, the first Democratic victory in a Secretary of State's race since 1958.

Democratic primary

Candidates
 Kathy Karpan, former Director of the Wyoming Department of Health and Social Services

Results

Republican primary

Candidates
 K. C. Thomson, Sheridan banker, son of incumbent State Treasurer Thyra Thomson
 Jerry Geis, President of the Wyoming Senate

Results

General election

Results

Auditor
Incumbent Republican State Auditor Jim Griffith declined to seek re-election to a fourth term. State House Speaker Jack Sidi won the Republican nomination unopposed, and faced Bil Tucker, a technical manager and a former Trustee on the Albany County School Board, in the general election. Sidi ultimately defeated Tucker by a decisive margin, though considerably reduced from Griffith's 1982 landslide.

Democratic primary

Candidates
 Bil Tucker, former Trustee on the Albany County School Board

Results

Republican primary

Candidates
 Jack Sidi, Speaker of the Wyoming House of Representatives

Results

General election

Results

Treasurer
In 1982, Wyoming voters approved a constitutional amendment that allowed state treasurers to seek re-election, making incumbent Republican State Treasurer Stan Smith the first treasurer in state history to be eligible for re-election to a second term. Though Smith initially announced that he would run for Governor, he ended his campaign and sought re-election as Treasurer. He faced a challenge in the Republican primary from Lee Galeotos, a former official in Governor Stanley Hathaway's administration, who announced that he would run for State Treasurer while Smith was running for governor. When Smith ran for re-election instead, Galeotos remained in the race. Smith defeated Galeotos by a wide margin, and faced former State Representative Carrol P. Orrison, the Democratic nominee, in the general election.

Democratic primary

Candidates
 Carrol P. Orrison, former State Representative from Laramie County

Results

Republican primary

Candidates
 Stan Smith, incumbent State Treasurer
 Sam Galeotos, former State Director of Administrative and Fiscal Control

Results

General election

Results

Superintendent of Public Instruction
Incumbent Democratic Superintendent of Public Instruction Lynn Simons ran for re-election to a third term. She faced Millard I. Meredith, the Superintendent of the Converse County School District No. 1 and the Republican nominee, in the general election. Simons defeated Meredith by a sizable margin, largely replicating her victory from 1986.

Democratic primary

Candidates
 Lynn Simons, incumbent Superintendent of Public Instruction

Results

Republican primary

Candidates
 Millard I. Meredith, Superintendent of the Converse County School District No. 1, 1978 Republican candidate for Superintendent of Public Instruction

Results

General election

Results

References

 
Wyoming